The Beaterio de Terciarias Agustinas Recoletas was the oldest convent for the Augustinian Recollect Order in the world established to meet the material and spiritual needs of pious women in the early part of the 18th century in the Philippines. The beaterio was founded by Dionisia de Santa Maria Mitas Talangpaz and Cecilia Rosa de Jesús Talangpaz, two Filipino sisters, both in blood and spirit, who hailed from barrio San Miguel of Calumpit, Bulacan. The convent's name was later changed to Beaterio de San Sebastian de Calumpang, but presently, it is now popularly known as the Congregation of the Augustinian Recollect Sisters. It is one of the three continuing congregation founded for native women in Asia after the Amantes de la Croix, was founded in Vietnam in 1670, and the Beaterio de la Compania de Jesus, now the Congregation of the Religious of the Virgin Mary, was founded in Manila in 1684. The original site of the beaterio was located inside Saint Rita College - Manila, one of the first three houses of the Augustinian Recollect Sisters, before it got damaged.

History of the Convent
The two Talangpaz sisters, who belonged to a religious lineage, decided to leave their comfortable life in pursuit of their spiritual calling even after their request for permission to wear the habit of mantelata were repeatedly turned down. When they heard that the Recollects admitted Filipino women into the Third Order, they proceeded to the Shrine of Our Lady of Mt. Carmel in the Church of San Sebastian in Manila and rented a nipa hut in Bilibid Viejo behind the church apse in which two other native beatas soon joined them. By the help of Fray Juan de Santo Tomas de Aquino, OAR, they revealed to the priests their desire to don the habit of mantelata. After their credentials were carefully checked and their petition for the habit was approved, they were incorporated as tertiaries of the Order. They received the habit on the 16th day of July 1725. The nipa hut they rented together with the other beatas was the start of the formation of the congregation.

An unexpected crisis happened in the beaterio when it drew the attention of more aspirants than it could manage. To resolve the crisis, Fray Diego de San Jose, OAR, the prior of San Sebastian, impulsively demanded back the habits he had bestowed on the Talangpaz sisters and ordered them to vacate the house in the convent garden and immediately demolished the house. The sisters later sought out the prior himself to assure him with these words:  "Fray Diego, please bear with us. Now you spurn us and send us away, but you can be certain that later, you will be pleased to receive us back and grant us the holy habit again, and not only the two of us but others as well whom Our Lady of Carmel will call to give us company.  We have great hopes that she will grant us this favor to our deep joy and that of the Recollect fathers, too.  But for now, we have to be patient and suffer till Our Lord and his Most Holy Mother will have mercy on us."

Haunted by the words of these women of faith, the Prior requested the Provincial of the Order that they be granted with the habit of mantelatas and that the community of beatas, henceforth, be assisted by the Recollects in accordance with the Sacred Constitutions of the Order. Consequently, the rites of the re-investiture of the Talangpas Sisters were held in the year 1728, probably on the feast of Our Lady of Mt. Carmel. They re-adopted the respective names they took in 1725, namely – Sor Dionisia de Santa Maria and Sor Cecilia Rosa de Jesus.

Construction of the Convent

In 1731, the Beaterio achieved its formal foundation. Fray Andres de San Fulgencio undertook the construction of a more permanent building to house the Recollect Tertiaries, the first religious women. Fray Benito de San Pablo, Superior of San Sebastian at that time, solicited donations from benefactors such as Brother General, Sergeant Major D. Jose Beltran de Salazar and Don Jose Barreto. The construction continued until 1747. The Convent had a long, spacious living room divided into cells. At the end was a kitchenette and bathroom made of concrete materials. The sisters lived in this building until 1907. To respond to the growing needs of the Church, the Beaterio expanded and established their first three houses: Saint Rita College - Manila, Colegio de Santa Monica – Cavite City and Colegio de San Jose – Cuyo, Palawan.

Renovations
The first house where the first sisters or beatas resided were made of cane and nipa. The second house, which was bigger than the first, became roofless after the 1880 Luzon earthquakes. The third house was made of strong foundation, now part of Saint Rita College - Manila and is still standing today. A Chapel was built on June 1, 1907.

Gallery

References 

Buildings and structures in Quiapo, Manila
Convents in the Philippines
Religious organizations established in 1731